Warehouses in Omaha Multiple Property Submission is a National Register of Historic Places Multiple Property Submission in Omaha, Nebraska, that was submitted in 1991. The submission included a group of several downtown Omaha warehouses that were constructed by businessmen developing Omaha's central role in the U.S. ground-based transportation network of the late 19th- and early 20th centuries.

Buildings listed on the register

See also
 Jobbers Canyon Historic District
 Omaha Rail and Commerce Historic District
 Old Market Historic District

References

National Register of Historic Places Multiple Property Submissions in Nebraska
National Register of Historic Places in Omaha, Nebraska
Warehouses on the National Register of Historic Places
Commercial buildings on the National Register of Historic Places in Nebraska